Tommaso Lequio di Assaba (October 21, 1893 – December 17, 1965) was an Italian horse rider who competed in the 1920 Summer Olympics, 1924 Summer Olympics, and 1928 Summer Olympics.

Biography
In 1920 he and his horse Trebecco won the gold medal in the individual jumping event. Four years later he and Trebecco won the silver medal in individual jumping. They finished fifth in the team jumping competition as part of the Italian team. He competed in the individual eventing competition with his horse Torena, but they were not able to finish. Nevertheless, they won the bronze medal as part of the Italian team in the team eventing competition.

In 1928 he was not able to finish the individual eventing competition again, this time with his horse Uroski. Therefore, the Italian team also did not finish the team eventing competition. With his horse Trebecco he finished fourth as part of the Italian team in the team jumping competition, after finishing 24th in the individual jumping event.

References

External links 
 Rider profile
 TOMMASO LEQUIO IL PIÙ GRANDE DEI CAVALIERI 

1893 births
1965 deaths
Italian show jumping riders
Italian event riders
Olympic equestrians of Italy
Italian male equestrians
Equestrians at the 1920 Summer Olympics
Equestrians at the 1924 Summer Olympics
Equestrians at the 1928 Summer Olympics
Olympic gold medalists for Italy
Olympic silver medalists for Italy
Olympic bronze medalists for Italy
Olympic medalists in equestrian
Medalists at the 1924 Summer Olympics
Medalists at the 1920 Summer Olympics